John V may refer to:

 Patriarch John V of Alexandria or John the Merciful (died by 620), Patriarch of Alexandria from 606 to 616
 John V of Constantinople, Patriarch from 669 to 675
 Pope John V (685–686), Pope from 685 to his death in 686
 John V of Jerusalem, Greek Orthodox Patriarch of Jerusalem in 706–735
 John V the Historian or Hovhannes Draskhanakerttsi, Catholicos of Armenia from 897 to 925
 John V of Gaeta (1010–1040)
 John V of Naples (died 1042), Duke from 1036 to 1042
 John V, Count of Soissons, (1281–1304)
 John V, Margrave of Brandenburg-Salzwedel (1302–1317)
 John V Palaiologos (1332–1391), Byzantine Emperor from 1341
 John V, Count of Sponheim-Starkenburg (1359–1437), German nobleman
 John V, Lord of Arkel (1362–1428)
 John V, Duke of Brittany (1389–1442), Count of Montfort
 John V, Duke of Mecklenburg (1418–1443)
 John V, Count of Hoya (died 1466), nicknamed the Pugnacious or the Wild
 John V, Count of Armagnac (1420–1473)
 John V, Duke of Saxe-Lauenburg (1439–1507)
 John V, Count of Oldenburg (1460–1526)
 John V, Prince of Anhalt-Zerbst (1504–1551), German prince of the House of Ascania and ruler of Anhalt-Dessau
 John V of Portugal (1689–1750), King of Portugal and the Algarves

See also
 John 5, the fifth chapter of the Gospel of John
 John 5 (guitarist) (John William Lowery, born 1971), American guitarist
 Johann V, Duke of Mecklenburg-Schwerin
 Jean V de Bueil (1406–1477)